Puentes is a surname. Notable people with the surname include:

Adonis Puentes (born 1974), Cuban-Canadian singer-songwriter
Adrián Puentes (born 1988), Cuban archer
Germán Puentes (born 1972), Spanish tennis player

See also
Fuentes (surname)
Puente (surname)